The Morgan family is an American family and banking dynasty, which became prominent in the U.S. and throughout the world in the late 19th century and early 20th century. Members of the family amassed an immense fortune over the generations, primarily through the noted work of John Pierpont (J. P.) Morgan (1837–1913).

Morgan members were notable for dominating the banking industry during their time. J. P. Morgan was the de facto leader of this dynasty, having been the most prominent businessman in America at the turn of the century. He revolutionized numerous industries, including electricity, railroad, and steel. Through his business methods, he was highly successful in asserting his power as one of the most influential businessmen in America. Historians describe the Morgan family along with its web of partners to be part of the large American banking empire known as the House of Morgan. It is difficult to place an exact beginning and end date on the dynasty. However, many scholars attribute the death of J. P. Morgan to the end of the banking dynasty. American journalist and historian Ron Chernow wrote about the prominence of this dynasty under J. S. Morgan and J. P. Morgan. In The House of Morgan: An American Banking Dynasty and the Rise of Modern Finance, he chronicles the lives of the Morgans, whose lives are "encrusted with legend... ripe with mystery, [and] exposed to such bitter polemics".

History 
The Morgan family originated in Wales during the 17th century. Born in Llandaff, Glamorgan County, Miles Morgan was the son of William Morgan. At the age of 20, Miles sailed for America, along with his brothers, John and James, seeking new opportunities in the New World. Arriving in April 1636, he landed in the Massachusetts Bay Colony. Settling in Roxbury and later Springfield, Massachusetts, Miles met Prudence Gilbert, his future wife. Miles was a soldier during the sack of Springfield. He later worked on a farm and lived a comfortable life. He continued living in the city until the age of eighty-three.

One of his sons, Nathaniel, continued the legacy of the Morgan name by becoming a powerful member of his small town. Nathaniel had many professions in his town, including Fence Viewer, hayward, field driver, constable, surveyor, and assessor. He married Hannah Bird on January 19, 1691, daughter of James Bird of Farmington, CT.

Nathaniel's son, Joseph Morgan, was the fifth of seven children. Born on December 3, 1702, Joseph began to learn to weave at a young age. At the age of 21, he became a soldier in the company of Captain Josiah Kellogg of Suffield. Upon his father's death, he inherited part of Chicopee Field. He married Mary Stebbins in 1735 and raised a family on a farm of two hundred acres. Upon his death, he gave much of his property to sons Joseph, Jr., and Titus.

Joseph, Jr. was elected Lieutenant and later Captain of the 8th Company in the 3rd Regiment of the Hampshire County, Massachusetts militia on April 26, 1776. Upon his death, one of his sons, Joseph III, received 112 acres of land.

Joseph III was the first to enter the financial industry, which is what the family is known for today. He left the family business of working on farms behind. In 1812, he joined the Washington Benevolent Society as a private banker. He moved the family to Hartford, which existed as one of the most prominent trade centers in the Connecticut River Valley. In November 1816, he purchased the Hartford Exchange Coffee House, where he acted as an innkeeper. It stood as the focal point of all business affairs and social activities in the area; the idea of meeting new clients and collaborating with other businessmen in these coffee shops and inns allowed for the growth of the industry in America. In July 1825, he bought the Hartford Bank. Joseph III purchased and reorganized the Hartford Fire Insurance Company into the Aetna Fire Insurance Company. (Many of these business deals were conducted at his inn, which acted as a hub for businessmen.) After a fire struck several New York City buildings, which held insurance plans from Aetna, Joseph Morgan III made prompt payments to the companies. New business suddenly poured in, as the insurance company was seen as highly reliable and trustworthy.  The partners of the firm and the stockholders made large sums of money in future years. After moving from the farming business to the coffee house business, Joseph III decided it was time to turn to finance. He purchased the City Hotel on Main Street, which he renovated and cleaned up; business at the hotel boomed like never before. He married Sarah Morgan (née Spencer), who was the Director of the Hartford Orphan Asylum. He acted as a director of the firm until his death.

Junius Spencer (J. S.) Morgan, Joseph III's son, played a prominent role in the banking industry. From a young age, he showed interest in entering the business field like his father. In 1829, at the age of 15, he worked as an apprentice with a merchant, Alfred Welles, in Boston. Following that, he worked at some firms including:
 Morgan, Ketchum, and Company of New York (1834–1836)
 Howe, Mather, and Company; later known as Mather, Morgan, and Company (1836–1851)
 J. M. Beebe, Morgan, and Company (1851–1854), Boston's largest mercantile bank at the time
 George Peabody and Company (1854–1864)
In 1864, Junius Morgan changed the name of George Peabody and Company to J. S. Morgan and Company. Under his leadership, it became one of the most prominent banking firms in both America and Europe. At the age of 64, J. S. Morgan retired.

Perhaps the most prominent member of the family is J. P. Morgan (1837–1913), son of J. S. Morgan. He became exposed to his father's business deals at an early age. He worked as an accountant until eventually becoming a partner at Drexel, Morgan & Co. in 1871.
By 1885, he began buying out railroads and reorganizing them. Through his business strategies, the term "Morganization" was coined to describe his method of creating monopolies through buying companies, eliminating competition, and cutting costs. By the turn of the century, he became incredibly successful in his business endeavors, controlling most of the major industries in America. During the Panic of 1907, J. Pierpont Morgan bailed out the U.S. government.

The key characteristic of the Morgan banking style, perpetuated by J. P. Morgan, exists where banks "perpetuate an ancient European tradition of wholesale banking, serving governments, large corporations, and rich individuals". J. Pierpont Morgan was also a member of numerous social clubs including the Union League, New York Yacht Club, and Knickerbocker Club. In 1891, he also founded his own club, the Metropolitan Club. Famous members included Cornelius Vanderbilt, Darius Ogden Mills, and more. The club had 1200 resident and 500 non-resident members at its founding. These social clubs were important in establishing relationships among powerful leaders of American society. Modeled after British social clubs, these organizations had people who held a tremendous influence over everyday life, such as bankers, politicians, lawyers, and railroad tycoons.

J. P. Morgan's legacy was continued by his son of the same name, although his son never became as prominent as his father. Born in 1867, John Pierpont Morgan, Jr. attended Harvard University, class of 1889. Also known as "Jack", he entered the banking industry, like his father, becoming a partner at Drexel, Morgan and Company, Bankers and Brokers of New York City in 1892. He helped in the establishment of J.P. Morgan and Company, which was founded in 1894. Yet, his life marked the decline and fall of the Morgan dynasty. With the passage of the Glass-Steagall Act in 1933, which restricted the merging of investment and commercial banks, came the end of the period of Robber barons and banking dominance. Thus, J. P. Morgan and Company became a commercial bank, and Morgan Stanley an investment bank. Through new legislation, and a growing public resentment against big business, the opportunities for Jack were rare compared to his predecessors. Additionally, Jack suffered from many ailments, such as neuritis, to the point where he had to resign from numerous positions. Lastly, The bankers of the pre-1913 Baronial Age are said to have been the “lords of creation”, since they catapulted the American economy into an industrial powerhouse of production and power. This unprecedented development became attributed to the Morgan banking style. The Morgan family are members of the Episcopal Church.

Wealth 

By one estimate, J. P. Morgan (1837–1913) is believed to have been the 24th richest American in history, inflation-adjusted. His fortune is believed to have grown to about $38 billion (2007 USD).

According to historians Michael M. Klepper and Robert E. Gunther, Morgan had one of the highest wealth: GNP ratios in American history. In their book, The Wealthy 100: From Benjamin Franklin to Bill Gates, Morgan's wealth:GNP ratio was 328. At the time, his fortune equaled around $119 billion.

Genealogy

William Morgan Branch

 William Morgan (1582–1649) m. Elizabeth Morgan (née Morgan), the father-in-law of William Morgan (of Machen and Tredegar).
 John Morgan (1605–1699)
 James Morgan (1607–1685)
 Miles Morgan (1616–1699) m. (1) Prudence Morgan (née Gilbert) m. (2) Elizabeth Morgan (née Bliss)
 Mary Morgan (1644–1683) m. Edmund Primrides, then Nicholas Rust
 Burt Jonathan Morgan (1646–1714) m. Sarah Morgan (née Cooley)
 David Morgan (1648–1731) m. Mary Morgan (née Clark)
 Pelatiah Morgan (1650–1675) m. Lydia Morgan (née unknown)
 Isaac Morgan (1652–1706) m. Abigail Morgan (née Gardner)
 Lydia Morgan (1654–1737) m. (1) Edmund Marshall m. (2) John Pierce
 Hannah Morgan (1656–1697) m. Samuel Terry, II
 Mercy Morgan (1658–1660)
 Nathaniel Morgan (1671–1752) m. Hannah Morgan (née Bird)
 Nathaniel Morgan (1692–1763)
 Samuel Morgan (1694–1777) m. Rachel Morgan (née Smith)
 Ebenezer Morgan (1696–1770) m. Abigail Morgan (née Ashley), then m. Lydia Morgan
 Hannah Morgan (1698–1784) m. Joseph Kellogg
 Miles Morgan (1700–1783) m. Lydia Morgan (née Day)
 Joseph Morgan (1702–1786) m. Mary Morgan (née Stebbins)
 Joseph Morgan, Jr. (1736–1813) m. Experience Morgan (née Smith)
 Eurydice Morgan (b. 1765)
 Huldah Morgan (1767–1770)
 Huldah Morgan (b. 1770)
 Nancy Morgan (1772–1835)
 Achsah Morgan (1774–1868)
 Elizabeth Morgan (1782-1850) married Thomas Snow (1778-1838)
 Joseph Morgan III (1780–1847) m. Sarah Morgan (née Spencer)
 Mary Morgan (1808–1897)
 Lucy Morgan (1811–1890)
 Junius Spencer Morgan (1813–1890) m. Juliet Pierpont (See Junius Spencer Morgan Branch Below)
 Betsey Morgan (1782–1786)
 Titus Morgan (1737–1739)
 Titus Morgan (1740–1834) m. Sarah Morgan (née Morgan)
 Lucas Morgan (b. 1742/3)
 Elizabeth Morgan (1745–1782) m. Thomas White, Jr.
 Judah Morgan (b. 1748/9) m. Elizabeth Shivoy
 Jesse Morgan (b. 1748)
 Hannah Morgan (b. 1751/2) m. John Legg
 James Morgan (1705–1786) m. Mercy Morgan (née Bliss)
 Isaac Morgan, II (c. 1707 – 1796) m. Ruth Morgan (née Alvord)
 Elizabeth Morgan (1710–1745)

Junius Spencer Morgan Branch

 Junius Spencer (J.S.) Morgan (1813–1890) m. Juliet (Julia) Morgan (née Pierpont)
 John Pierpont (J.P.) Morgan (1837–1913) m. (1) Amelia Sturges (1835–1862) m. (2) Frances Louisa Morgan (née Tracy)
 Louisa Pierpont Morgan (1866–1946) m. Herbert "Penny" Livingston Satterlee
 John Pierpont Morgan, Jr. (1867–1943) m. Jane Norton Morgan (née Grew)
 Junius Spencer Morgan III (1892–1960) m. 1944: Louise Converse
 John Pierpont Morgan II (1918-2004) m. Claire Byrd Ober (1922-2008)
 Junius Spencer Morgan IV m. 1970: Patricia Adele Milton
 John Pierpont Morgan III m. 1977: Bonnie Allis Barr
 Linda Louise Morgan m. 1945: John Joseph Filz
 Frederick C. Morgan
 Samantha Morgan
 John (Jack) Pierpont Morgan V
 Louise Morgan (1917-2006) m. Raymond Clark, then Charles R. Hook, Jr. (d. 1961)
 Raymond Clark, Jr., Junius Clark, Jonathan Clark, Leah h. Hook
 Ann Morgan (1923-2019) m. 1957: Henry Simoneau
 Jane Norton Morgan (1893-1981) m George Nichols (1878-1950)
 Jane Norton Nichols (1918-1998) m. 1942 Walter H. Page II (1915-1999, son of Arthur W. Page)
 Frances Tracy Morgan (1897–1989) m. 1917: Paul Geddes Pennoyer (1890–1970).
 Robert Morgan Pennoyer (b. 1925) m. Victoria Parsons (1928–2013)
 Tracy Pennoyer m. 1988: John Winthrop Auchincloss II (son of Louis Auchincloss) 
 Peter Pennoyer (b. 1957) m. 1988: Katherine Lee "Katie" Ridder (granddaughter of Bernard J. Ridder)
 Henry Sturgis Morgan (1900–1982), co-founder of Morgan Stanley m. Catherine Morgan (née Adams) 
 Henry Sturgis Morgan Jr. (1924–2011) m. (1) 1945: Fanny Gray Little (div. 1972), m. (2) Jean Alexandra McCain, (daughter of John S. McCain, Jr.)
  John Adams Morgan (b. 1930) m. (1) 1953: Elizabeth Robbins Choate (1933–1998) (div. 1957); m. (2) Tania Goss (div.) m. (3) 1998: Sonja Tremont (b. 1963) (div. 2008)
 John Adams Morgan Jr (b. 1954)
 Chauncey Goss Morgan
 Quincy Adams Morgan
 Juliet Pierpont Morgan (1870–1952) m. William Pierson Hamilton (1869–1950)
 Anne Tracy Morgan (1873–1952)
 Sarah Spencer Morgan (1839–1896) m. George Hale Morgan (1840–1911)
 Junius Spencer Morgan II (1867–1932) m. Josephine Adams Perry (1869–1963)
 Sarah Spencer Morgan (1893–1949) m. Henry B. Gardner (1891–1932)
 Alexander Perry Morgan (1900–1968) m. Janet Croll (1901–1985)
 Mary Lyman Morgan (1844–1919) m. Walter Hayes Burns (1838–1897)
 Mary Ethel Burns (d. 1961) m. Lewis Harcourt, 1st Viscount Harcourt (1863–1922)
 Hon. Doris Mary Thérèse Harcourt (1900–1981) m. Alexander Baring, 6th Baron Ashburton (1898–1991)
 John Francis Harcourt Baring, 7th Baron Ashburton (1928–2020) m. (1) Hon. Susan Mary Renwick (daughter of the 1st Baron Renwick) m. (2) Sarah Cornelia Spencer-Churchill (daughter of John Spencer-Churchill)
 Hon. Lucinda Mary Louise Baring (b. 1956) m. Hon. Michael John Wilmont Malet Vaughan (son of the 8th Earl of Lisburne)
 Mark Francis Robert Baring, 8th Baron Ashburton (b. 1958) m. Miranda Caroline Moncrieff
 Hon. Rose Theresa Baring (b. 1961) m. Barnaby Hugh Rogerson (b. 1960)
 Hon. Alexander Nicholas John Baring (b. 1964) m. Lucy Caroline Fraser
 Hon. Robin Alexander Baring (b. 1931) m. Ann Caroline Thalia Gage (b. 1931)
 Francesca Rhiannon Baring (b. 1963) m. Stuart Douglas 
 Hon. Olivia Vernon Harcourt (1902–1984) m. The Hon. John Mulholland (d. 1948) (son of the 2nd Baron Dunleath)
 Mary Norah Mulholland (b. 1924) m. John William Owen Elliot-Murray-Kynynmound (1921–2005)
 Martin Edward Harcourt Mulholland (1927–2003) m. Lilian Diana Tindall Lucas
 Bridget Olivia Mulholland (b. 1930) m. Gerald Cecil Williams (1916–2005)
 William Edward Harcourt, 2nd Viscount Harcourt (1908–1979) m. Hon. Maud Elizabeth Grosvenor (daughter of the 4th Baron Ebury)
 Hon. Elizabeth Ann Harcourt (b. 1932) m. Crispin Gascoigne (1929–2001) (son of Julian Gascoigne)
 Hon. Penelope Mary Harcourt (b. 1933) m. Anthony David Motion
 Hon. Virginia Harcourt (b. 1937) m. Julian Francis Wells
 Barbara Vernon Harcourt (1905–1961) m. (1) Robert Jenkinson (1900–1970) m. (2) William James Baird 
 Walter Spencer Morgan Burns (1872–1929) m. Ruth Evelyn Cavendish-Bentinck (1883–1978) (daughter of William George Cavendish-Bentinck)
 Cynthia Mary Burns (d. 1977) m. Sir John Carew Pole, 12th Baronet (1902–1993)
 Elizabeth Mary Carew Pole (b. 1929) m. David Cuthbert Tudway Quilter (1921–2007)
 Caroline Anne Carew Pole (b. 1933) m. Hon. Paul Asquith (1927–1984) (son of the Baron Asquith)
 Sir Richard Carew Pole, 13th Baronet (b. 1938) m. Mary Dawnay (b. 1936)
 Junius Spencer Morgan, Jr. (1846–1858)
 Juliet Pierpont Morgan (1847–1923)
  John Junius Morgan (d. 1952)

Family Network

Associates

George Fisher Baker
Robert Bacon
Charles A. Coffin
Edmund C. Converse
Henry Pomeroy Davison
Anne Murray Dike
Anthony Joseph Drexel
Thomas Edison
Elbert Henry Gary
Robert Gordon
Henry Herman Harjes
Florence Jaffray Harriman
James J. Hill
J. Bruce Ismay
Thomas W. Lamont
Charles D. Lanier
Cyrus McCormick Jr.
Charles Sanger Mellen
William Henry Moore
Samuel Endicott Peabody
George Walbridge Perkins
Cecil Spring Rice
Samuel Spencer
Harold Stanley
Charles Steele
Edward R. Stettinius
Edward T. Stotesbury
Myron Charles Taylor
William Kissam Vanderbilt
James Hood Wright

Businesses

Aetna
Alabama Great Southern Railroad
Bankers Trust
Buffalo, Bradford and Pittsburgh Railroad
Carolina & Northwestern Railway
Central New England Railway
Chesapeake & Ohio Railway
Chicago and Atlantic Railway
Easton & Amboy Railroad
Erie Railroad
General Electric
Georgia Southern and Florida Railway
Hocking Valley Railway
International Harvester
International Mercantile Marine Company
J.P. Morgan & Co.
Lehigh Valley Railroad
Morgan, Grenfell & Co.
Morgan, Harjes & Co.
Morgan Stanley
New Jersey and New York Railroad
New York, New Haven and Hartford Railroad
New York, Ontario and Western Railway
New York, Providence and Boston Railroad
New York, Susquehanna & Western Railway
Northern Pacific Railroad
Nypano Railroad
Pullman Palace Car Company
Rutland Railroad
Southern Central Railroad
Southern Railway
United Dry Goods
U.S. Steel

Non-profit organizations & philanthropy

American Committee for Devastated France
Church Club of New York
Colony Club
Groton School
J.Pierpont Morgan Wing (Metropolitan Museum of Art)
Lying-In Hospital
Metropolitan Club
Morgan Library & Museum
Society for the Prevention of Useless Giving

See also 
 J. P. Morgan
 Junius Spencer Morgan
 Rockefeller family
 Mellon family
 List of banking families

Select bibliography 
 The House of Morgan: An American Banking Dynasty and the Rise of Modern Finance, by Ron Chernow

References

External links

 
Business families of the United States
Episcopalian families